Ian McClure may refer to:

Ian McClure (bowls) (born 1973), Irish bowler
Ian McClure (politician) (1905–1982), Irish surgeon and politician